Vinícius Lopes Laurindo (born 3 May 1990), better known as just Neguete, is a profession centre back who plays for Clube do Remo.

Contract
 Cruzeiro.

References

External links
 ogol
 soccerway

1990 births
Living people
Brazilian footballers
Brazilian expatriate footballers
Cruzeiro Esporte Clube players
Tupi Football Club players
Associação Ferroviária de Esportes players
Esporte Clube Juventude players
Luverdense Esporte Clube players
Esporte Clube Água Santa players
Foolad FC players
Persija Jakarta players
Clube do Remo players
Campeonato Brasileiro Série A players
Campeonato Brasileiro Série B players
Campeonato Brasileiro Série C players
Campeonato Brasileiro Série D players
Persian Gulf Pro League players
Liga Portugal 2 players
Association football defenders
Brazilian expatriate sportspeople in Iran
Brazilian expatriate sportspeople in Indonesia
Brazilian expatriate sportspeople in Portugal
Expatriate footballers in Iran
Expatriate footballers in Indonesia
Expatriate footballers in Portugal
Footballers from Belo Horizonte